Centruroides chamulaensis is a species of scorpion in the family Buthidae.

References

Buthidae
Animals described in 1939
Centruroides